Piyas Lake is a natural lake in South Dakota, in the United States.

Piyas Lake has the name of Piya, a local Native American.

See also
List of lakes in South Dakota

References

Lakes of South Dakota
Lakes of Marshall County, South Dakota